Fung Yuen is an area and a village located northwest of Tolo Harbour, in Tai Po, Tai Po District, Hong Kong.

Administration
Fung Yuen is a recognized village under the New Territories Small House Policy. For electoral purposes, it is part of the Hong Lok Yuen constituency of the Tai Po District Council. It was formerly represented by Zero Yiu Yeuk-sang, who was elected in the local elections until May 2021.

Villages
There are five villages in Fung Yuen:
 Fung Mei Wai, formerly Kau Shi Wai
 Fung Yuen Lo Tsuen
 Lau Hang
 Mak Uk
 Tin Sam

History
At the time of the 1911 census, the population of Fung Yuen was 133. The number of males was 60.

Conservation
Fung Yuen Valley has been listed as a Site of Special Scientific Interest (SSSI) since 1980 to reflect "its importance as a major breeding site for butterflies". The protected area covers approximately 43 hectares. Within this area, the Fung Yuen Butterfly Reserve was set up on 2 hectares of private land in 2005 by the Tai Po Environmental Association through the funding from the Environment and Conservation Fund.

References

Further reading

External links

 Delineation of area of existing village Fung Yuen (Tai Po) for election of resident representative (2019 to 2022)
 Picture of Mak Ancestral Hall, Mak Uk
 Antiquities Advisory Board. Historic Building Appraisal. No. 67 Fung Yuen Pictures

Populated places in Hong Kong
Villages in Tai Po District, Hong Kong